The Norwalk Oyster Festival is an annual fair in the city of Norwalk, Connecticut, United States, held on the first weekend after Labor Day in Veterans Park, near Long Island Sound.

Funds raised by the festival help the Norwalk Seaport Association maintain the Sheffield Island Lighthouse as well as develop science education classes.  The festival is also used as a fundraiser by more than 20 other local non-profit organizations.

The festival has been run by the Norwalk Seaport Association, a non profit organization, since its inception in 1978.  Average annual attendance exceeds 90,000.  Each year, the Oyster Festival contributes over $5 million to the local economy. 

It features various food, vendors, and entertainment, and celebrates the history of the oyster industry based in Norwalk. In the past, featured performers have included the Village People, Kansas, Charlie Daniels Band, Joe Walsh, Willie Nelson, Blood, Sweat & Tears, Tito Puente, Cheap Trick, Little Feat, The Monkees, Judy Collins, Up with People, and Little Richard.

History
The 29th annual Oyster Festival took place Friday, September 8 to Sunday, September 10, 2006.  Bo Bice, Dion, and Asia were featured performers.

The 30th annual festival took place September 7 to September 9, 2007 with the Village People heading up the entertainment, the band's third appearance. Jay and the Americans were also booked for the event.

The 31st annual festival took place September 5 to September 7, 2008.  The festival was called off on Saturday the 6th to accommodate the rain from Hurricane Hanna.  Los Lonely Boys performed Friday evening and Kathy Sledge performed Sunday evening.

The 43rd annual event is deferred to 2021 since there was no event in 2020 caused by COVID-19 pandemic.

Incidents and accidents
On September 8, 2013, 17 children and one adult were injured in an amusement ride accident in when a swing ride suffered a mechanical failure. Several injured were transported to Norwalk, Stamford and Bridgeport hospitals. None of the injuries were life-threatening.

See also
 Oyster festival
 Milford Oyster Festival

Notes

External links
 Norwalk Seaport Association Oyster Festival

Culture of Norwalk, Connecticut
Festivals in Connecticut
Oyster Festival
Food and drink festivals in the United States
Tourist attractions in Fairfield County, Connecticut
Oyster festivals